Brassicibacter mesophilus is a Gram-negative, mesophilic, strictly anaerobic, non-spore-forming and motile bacterium from the genus of Brassicibacter which has been isolated from food industry wastewater.

References

Bacillota
Bacteria described in 2012